Lina Olinda Pedraza Rodríguez (born 1955) is a Cuban politician and has been the Cuban Minister of Finances and Prices from 2009 to 2019. She was appointed after 2009 shake-up by Raúl Castro.

Education and career
Pedraza has a bachelor's degree in economic control. She served in Villa Clara, in the banking sector and at the Ministry of Finance and Prices. She was minister of Audits and Control from 2001 to 2006, when she was promoted to member of the Secretariat and Head of the Economics Department of the Central Committee of the Communist Party of Cuba (CCPCC). She is also a deputy at the National Assembly of Popular Power.

References

1955 births
Living people
Cuban economists
Finance ministers of Cuba
Communist Party of Cuba politicians
Members of the National Assembly of People's Power
Women government ministers of Cuba
Female finance ministers
21st-century Cuban women politicians
21st-century Cuban politicians